Spring Valley High School is located in unincorporated Northeast Columbia, South Carolina, United States, and is operated by Richland County School District Two. Opened in the fall of 1970, it was for a long time the sole high school operating in Richland School District Two, replacing Dentsville High School.

History

The school had an unusual design. The main building was divided into octagonal 'pods', each containing eight chevron-shaped classrooms. This design was borne out of the open classroom concept that was popular during the late 1960s and early 1970s. In the school's early days, classrooms within each pod had no walls, allowing students to participate in any one of several classes occurring at one time. This did not prove successful, and walls were later added to separate the classroom pods by the early 1980s.

In 2008, a new three story building replaced the pods as the new school building, integrating the original gymnasium and fine arts buildings as the only remaining pieces of the original campus.

On October 26, 2015, a Richland County sheriff's deputy who was serving as Spring Valley's school resource officer was called to a classroom to remove a female student from her classroom. The female student was arrested on a charge called "disturbing schools" for refusing to give up her cell phone and leave the room. She was then pulled from the desk by the officer, thrown to the floor and handcuffed. Another female student in the classroom was also charged with disturbing schools after she allegedly yelled and cursed at the officer. The officer was fired after an internal review found that his actions ran counter to sheriff's department policy. The FBI and the US Department of Justice are investigating to determine if the deputy violated the student's civil rights. In response to the incident, South Carolina lawmakers, led by Rep. Mia McLeod, have proposed limitations to the state statute that defines when students can be arrested for disrupting schools. School district administrators also promised to conduct additional staff training about when to involve school resource officers in future incidents.

Magnet programs
The discovery magnet program is designed for talented students and focuses on science and math, first founded in 1995. These courses are honors level and required for all members of the Discovery program.  All discovery members are required to complete two college-level research projects during their sophomore and junior year.  The completion of at least four AP courses (one math, one science, two others) is required for graduation from the discovery program.

The explorations program is the sister program to discovery. The program focuses on math and science, and is a college-preparatory program, as opposed to an honors program.

State championships 

Boys soccer: 2007
Football 1973, 1974, 1975, 1988 

Men's Track & Field 1978, 1988, 1989, 1991, 2003, 2013, 2022

Girls Basketball: 1978, 2009, 2011, 2015, 2016, 2018

Men’s Cross Country: 2003

Girls Cross Country: 1985, 1987, 1988, 1989, 1990, 1991

Girls Track: 1986, 1987, 1988, 1989, 1990, 1991, 1992, 1993, 1994, 2005

Girls Tennis: 1988, 1989

Boys Tennis: 1973, 1974, 1982, 2010

Boys Golf: 1972, 1979, 1981, 1988, 1989, 1990

Softball: 1991, 1993, 1994

Notable alumni 

 Michael Boulware – NFL defensive back
 Peter Boulware – NFL linebacker
 P. J. Dozier  – NBA guard for Sacramento Kings
 Ainsley Earhardt –  Fox News Channel anchor
 Lethon Flowers – NFL defensive back
 Taylor Guerrieri – MLB baseball player
 Terrance Hayes – poet
 Monique Hennagan –  Olympic runner
 Danielle Howle – songwriter
 Tyrone Legette – NFL defensive back
 Christian Miller – NFL linebacker
 Andre Roberts – NFL wide receiver for Carolina Panthers
 Scott Sartiano – restaurateur and club owner
 Willie Williams – NFL defensive back
  Jordan Bruner  - Professional Basketball
 Channing Tindall - Inside Linebacker

References 

Public high schools in South Carolina
Magnet schools in South Carolina
Schools in Richland County, South Carolina
Educational institutions established in 1970
1970 establishments in South Carolina